Hancock is an unincorporated community in Pulaski County, in the U.S. state of Missouri.

History
Hancock was platted in 1869, and named after Jap Hancock, a pioneer settler. A post office called Hancock was established in 1869, and remained in operation until 1955.

References

Unincorporated communities in Pulaski County, Missouri
Unincorporated communities in Missouri